The 1995 NAIA Division II football season, as part of the 1995 college football season in the United States and the 40th season of college football sponsored by the NAIA, was the 26th season of play of the NAIA's lower division for football.

The season was played from August to November 1995 and culminated in the 1995 NAIA Division II Football National Championship, played in Tacoma, Washington.

Central Washington and Findlay played to a 21–21 tie and were named co-national champions. It was the Wildcats' first NAIA national title and the Oilers' third.

Conference and membership changes

Conference changes
 This was the final season that the NAIA officially recognized a conference champion in football from the Texas Intercollegiate Athletic Association (TIAA). The remaining TIAA members subsequently joined either the NCAA Division II Lone Star Conference or the NCAA Division III American Southwest Conference.

Conference standings

Conference champions

Postseason

‡ Game played at Puyallup, Washington

See also
 1995 NCAA Division I-A football season
 1995 NCAA Division I-AA football season
 1995 NCAA Division II football season
 1995 NCAA Division III football season

References

 
NAIA Football National Championship